William Kennon Sr. (May 14, 1793 – November 2, 1881) was an American lawyer and politician who served three terms as a U.S. Representative from Ohio. He served in Congress from 1829 to 1833, then again from 1835 to 1837.

He was a cousin of William Kennon Jr.

Early life and career 
Born in Uniontown, Pennsylvania, Kennon moved with his parents to Belmont County, Ohio, in 1804. He attended the common schools and Franklin College, New Athens, Ohio. He studied law. He was admitted to the bar in 1824 and commenced practice in St. Clairsville, Ohio.

Congress 
Kennon was elected as a Jacksonian to the Twenty-first and Twenty-second Congresses (March 4, 1829 – March 3, 1833). He was an unsuccessful candidate for reelection in 1832 to the Twenty-third Congress.

Kennon was elected to the Twenty-fourth Congress (March 4, 1835 – March 3, 1837). He was an unsuccessful candidate for reelection in 1836 to the Twenty-fifth Congress.

Later career 
He served as president judge of the court of common pleas 1840–1847. He served as delegate to the second State constitutional convention in 1850. He was appointed to fill the unexpired term of William B. Caldwell as judge of the Ohio Supreme Court in 1854 by Governor William Medill. He resigned in 1856 and resumed the practice of law in St. Clairsville, Ohio.
 
Kennon became affiliated with the Republican Party at the outbreak of the Civil War.

Family life 
Kennon married Mary Ellis on June 16, 1825, and they had three children.

Death
Kennon died in St. Clairsville, Belmont County, Ohio, November 2, 1881. He was interred in Methodist Cemetery.

Sources

1793 births
1881 deaths
Ohio Constitutional Convention (1850)
People from Uniontown, Pennsylvania
Justices of the Ohio Supreme Court
People from St. Clairsville, Ohio
Ohio lawyers
Ohio Democrats
Franklin College (New Athens, Ohio)
Ohio Republicans
Jacksonian members of the United States House of Representatives from Ohio
19th-century American politicians
Kennon family (Ohio)